Lili, often known as Tokyo Dream Girl Lili is a singer based in Japan. She is mostly known for her 2021 single Sushi which peaked to 11th position of Billboard's international chart of world album as of October 2021. She is known to have worked with Amada Records, DME World, Line Records etc. She also heads Tokyo Dream Girl.

Career 

Lili debuted her career with the single Invisible, in 2020. The single featured Fatman Scoop, and American rapper DreamDoll. The single was produced by VIRG and record labels DME World and Line Records. The producers used a dedicated project named Upload for the song to invite artists and choreographers to participate from across the world to be part of the official video of the song. In 2021, Lili released Sushi. The song reached 11th position in Billboard's international chart of world album as of October 2021. In January 2022, Lili dropped her single "Take Your Time" with Amada Records.

Chart

References 

Year of birth missing (living people)
Living people
21st-century Japanese women singers
21st-century Japanese singers